Bălțătești is a commune in Neamț County, Western Moldavia, Romania. It is composed of three villages: Bălțătești, Valea Arini, and Valea Seacă. It also included Ghindăoani village until 2003, when it was split off to form Ghindăoani Commune.

Bălțătești has several sources of mineral waters used for disease treatment purposes, a hotel and medical facilities. The natural landscape and the surroundings makes it a tourist destination.

The Bălțătești mine is a large salt mine situated on the administrative territory of the commune.

Natives
 Vasile Conta

References

Communes in Neamț County
Localities in Western Moldavia